Franktown may refer to:

Franktown, Colorado, a census-designated place (CDP) in Douglas County
Franktown, Nevada, a community that is the next stop from Virginia and Truckee Railroad Depot - Carson City
Franktown, Virginia, an unincorporated community in Northampton County
Franktown Cave, near Franktown, Colorado